Daana Veera Soora Karna is a 1977 Indian Telugu-language Hindu mythological film co-written, produced and directed by N. T. Rama Rao under his banner, Ramakrishna Cine Studios. Based on the life of Karna from the Mahabharata, it stars Rama Rao in three roles: the title character, Duryodhana, and Krishna. It also stars Rao's sons Nandamuri Harikrishna and Nandamuri Balakrishna, who play the roles of Arjuna and Abhimanyu, respectively. Music for the film was composed by Pendyala Nageswara Rao.

Made on a budget of 10 lakhs (one million Indian rupees), the film was a commercial success and became the highest-grossing Telugu film at the time, grossing 1.52 crore (15–20 million rupees). It is regarded as one of the greatest films of Telugu cinema.

Plot 

A baby has been rescued from the Ganga river by charioteer Adhiratha, who adopts the boy and names him Karna. Years later, Karna witnesses the scene of Dronacharya taking off Ekalavya's thumb so that Arjuna could surpass him as an archer. At this injustice, Karna swears a rivalry against Arjuna.

Karna studies under Parasurama to become an expert archer. One day, Karna is bitten by Indra in the form of an insect and bears the pain so as not to disturb a sleeping Parasurama. When Parasurama awakens and sees the blood, he believes Karna to be of the kshatriya caste and curses him, as his efforts at teaching him would have been wasted. Parasurama later recognizes Karna as Sutaputra, but cannot take back his curse.

While traveling, Karna tries to save a Brahim's cow from Indra in the form of a lion; he fails, and the Brahim curses Karna to die in a helpless situation. Later, moved by a young girl's tears, Karna squeezes spilled ghee (butter) from the soil and is cursed by Bhudevi to be dishonored by crushing his chariot wheel into her in his last stage of life.

Arjuna is being praised by Dronacharya for winning an archery tournament at the fort of Hastinapuram, when Karna arrives to challenge him but is insulted due to his low birth. Duryodhana saves his pride by making him king of Anga, and Karna dedicates his life to Duryodhana and they become soulmates. Duryodhana is invited to join Dharmaraja, who suffers a series of misfortunes at the hands of Shakuni and is forced into years of exile. Lord Krishna attempts to negotiate and reveals Karna's birth secret. Out of loyalty, Karna remains with Duryodhana, while tensions escalate toward the Kurukshetra War with the Pandavas.

Chief military commander Bhishma insults Karna by recognizing him as Ardharatha, and Karna swears not to enter the battlefield before Bhishma. Bhishma collapses as the war begins, and makes contrition to Karna on an arrow bed. Karna takes Bhishma's blessing and enters the battlefield. To protect the Pandavas' honor, Abhimanyu enters the battlefield and single-handedly defeats most of the army; to stop him, Karna is ordered to destroy his bow, after which Abhimanyu is overwhelmed and killed. That evening, Karna weeps over the body of his defeated adversary and declares that Abhimanyu is an immortal whereas he was the one who had perished.

The next morning, Krishna sends Kunti to request Karna join the Pandavas or swear not to kill them. Karna blames Kunti, the mother who abandoned him, for the destruction, but swears not to kill anyone except Arjuna, on the condition that Kunti have five sons if either he or Arjuna dies. The next day on the battlefield, Karna tries to kill Arjuna, who is protected by Lord Krishna. He later defeats all the Pandavas after the deaths of his sons at their hands but every time, he remembers his promise to Kunti and does not kill them. After sparing the Pandavas, he announces to Kunti in the middle of the battle that ‘he had sacrificed his sons for hers’. Krishna sends Indra in the form of a Brahim to trick Karna into giving up the divine breastplate which protects him. Karna does so, even knowing the truth, and Indra gifts him a powerful weapon that can only be used once. While wishing to use it against Arjuna, Karna is forced to use it when the camp is attacked at night.

The next day, Shalya, an uncle of the Pandavas is appointed as Karna's charioteer and demoralizes him on Krishna's instructions.  The accumulated curses work together and Karna collapses. Krishna explains Karna's glory to Arjuna, then appears to Karna as a Brahim begging for alms. Karna breaks out his golden tooth as a donation. Kunti arrives and declares Karna's birth secret, angering Dharmaraja who curses the women against keeping secrets.

Karna dies in Kunti's lap and his soul enters Surya, the Sun God. Duryodhana attempts to abandon the war to grieve but is forced back.  He chooses his opponent to settle the war, but Krishna reveals Duryodhana's weak point which is struck in a dishonorable manner. As he dies, Duryodhana questions Krishna's piety. Duryodhana and Karna are then shown meeting in heaven, displaying an immortal friendship.

Cast 

 N. T. Rama Rao as Srikrishna, Karna, and Duryodhana
 Nandamuri Balakrishna as Abhimanyu
 Nandamuri Harikrishna as Arjuna
 Satyanarayana as Bhima
S. Varalakshmi as Kunti
 Gummadi as Parashurama
 Dhulipala Seetarama Sastry as Shakuni
 Mikkilineni as Bhishma
 Mukkamala as Shalya
 Rajanala as Drona
 M. Prabhakar Reddy as Dharma Raju
 P. J. Sarma as Vidura
 Chalapathi Rao as Indra, Adhiratha, Jarasandha and Dhrishtadyumna
 Jagga Rao as Dushasana
 Jaya Bhaskar as Ekalavya and Surya
 Sharada as Draupadi
 Kanchana as Subhadra
 B. Saroja Devi as Vrishali
 Prabha as Bhanumati
 Rajasree
 Deepa as Uttara
 Jayamalini as Dancer
 Halam as Dancer

Chalapathi Rao performed four roles and also appears in two other costumes as disguises of Indra, while Jaya Bhaskar did a dual role.

Soundtrack 
The music was composed by Pendyala Nageswara Rao.

S. Rajeswara Rao was initially the music director for the film, and set the songs "Ye Thalli Ninu Kannadho" and the verses were to music. The rest of the soundtrack was completed by Pendyala Nageswara Rao. However, the title card shows only Pendyala's name.

The film has ten songs and 35 verses. Most of the verses are taken from Paandavodyoga Vijayam and Sree Krishna Raayabaram by the poet duo Tirupati Venkata Kavulu. Pundareekakshayya secured the rights to use the verses when working on the film Sreekrishnaavataaram. They were sought for the competing film Kuruskshetram but Pundareekakshayya instead gave the rights to Rama Rao.

S. P. Balasubrahmanyam and Peesapati Raghuramayya sang initial versions of the Raayabaram verses, which were re-recorded by V. Ramakrishna.

Padmalaya Studios secured the rights of Ghantasala's Bhagavadgeeta audio after his death and used those verses in Kurukshetram, while DVS Karna used "prosaic" Bhagavadgeeta for the most part.

The dialogues of the film also became very popular, and were released as LP and audio cassettes by HMV.

Release 

The film was approved by censors on 12 January 1977 and released on 14 January. Gemini film labs was unable to print all 30 orders of the film in the time available, so its premiered was limited to 14 cinemas on the day of its release. The film ran for 100 days in 9 cinemas and 250 days at the Hyderabad Shanti Theatre.

With a budget of less than 10 lakhs (one million Indian rupees), the film earned more than ₹1 crore (ten million rupees) in its first run. It was sold for 60 lakhs (6 million rupees) for a 1994 re-release, with 30 prints earning more than ₹1 crore.

It was the second Telugu film after Lava Kusa to gross ₹1 crore (ten million rupees) and the first Telugu film to collect ₹2 crores (with an average ticket price being ₹1 in 1977).

In the first twenty years after its release, the film sold the highest number of tickets, beating all the new releases for the year in 13 different years.

The film was released on VCDs and DVDs by Universal Videos, SHALIMAR Video Company, Hyderabad.

Awards 
P. Susheela won Nandi Award for Best Female Playback Singer for the song "Kalagantino Swamy"

References

External links 

1977 films
Indian epic films
Films scored by Pendyala Nageswara Rao
1970s Telugu-language films
Films about Hinduism
Films based on the Mahabharata
Films directed by N. T. Rama Rao
Krishna in popular culture